Joseph or Joe Hamilton may refer to:

Sports
 Joseph Hamilton (American football coach) (1919–2014), American football coach
 Jody Hamilton (Joseph Hamilton, 1938–2021), American professional wrestler, promoter, and trainer
 Joe Hamilton (basketball) (born 1948), American basketball player
 Joey Hamilton (born 1970), American baseball player
 Joe Hamilton (American football) (born 1977), American football player and coach
 Joseph Hamilton (goalball)  (born 1978), American goalball player

Others
 Joseph B. Hamilton (1817–1902), American teacher, lawyer, judge, and Wisconsin state senator
 Joseph Hamilton (Wisconsin assemblyman) (1826–?), American politician; member of the Wisconsin state assembly
 Joseph "Jody" Hamilton (1885–1906), American mass murderer
 Joseph Gilbert Hamilton (1907–1957), American professor of medical physics and experimental medicine
 Joe Hamilton (producer) (1929–1991), American television producer; once married to comedian Carol Burnett
 Joseph H. Hamilton (born 1932), American physicist and professor at Vanderbilt University
 Joseph Hamilton (politician), Guyanese politician

See also
 Jo Hamilton (disambiguation)
 Joseph Hamilton Beattie (1808–1871), locomotive engineer with the London and South Western Railway
 Joseph Hamilton Daveiss (1774–1811), commanded the Dragoons of the Indiana Militia at the Battle of Tippecanoe
 Hamilton (name)